The Hermann Park Railroad is a 2-mile railroad in Houston's Hermann Park, in the U.S. state of Texas.

References

External links

 Train and Pedal Boats at the Hermann Park Convervancy

Hermann Park
Rail transportation in Texas